Unna Junná is a children's television program produced by Finnish public broadcaster Yle Sámi Radio several different Sámi languages. It was the first Sámi-language children's program on Finnish TV and it now airs in Northern, Inari, and Skolt Sámi languages. Since 2007, Unna Junná has aired on Yle and SVT television channels in Finland and Sweden respectively.

Program details
Each year, Yle produces thirty 15-minute episodes, half of which air in the spring and half in the fall. Unna Junná traditionally airs on Sunday mornings on Yle TV2 with reruns on Yle Teema & Fem and on-demand via the Yle Areena streaming service.

History
After years of advocacy and false starts, Yle added Unna Junná to its programming schedule in September 2007. The program was initially co-produced by Yle Sámi Radio and SVT-Sápmi, but since 2011 it has been produced solely by Yle after SVT decided to focus on its own Sámi children's programming.

Impact
Unna Junná is credited with sparking an interest in Sámi languages among children, playing an important role in the revival of endangered Sámi languages. In 2010, it won the main prize for children's programming at the Finno-Ugric Peoples' Film Festival in the Republic of Komi.

References

External links
 YLE Unna Junná webpage

Sámi mass media
Northern Sámi-language mass media
Finnish children's television series
Swedish children's television series
2007 Finnish television series debuts
Yle original programming
Sveriges Television original programming